Hugh Worthington (21 June 1752 – 26 July 1813) was a British Arian divine. He was born in Leicester and studied at the Daventry Academy under Caleb Ashworth. Worthington was a pastor at Salters' Hall, London, from 1782; a trustee of Dr Daniel Williams's foundations, 1785; and was a lecturer on classics and logic from 1786 to 1789. He published sermons and other writings.

He died on 26 July 1813 and was buried in Bunhill Fields burial ground.

See also

 List of English writers
 List of logicians
 List of people from London
 List of religious studies scholars

References

Attribution

Further reading
 
 

1752 births
1813 deaths
18th-century English people
18th-century Christian clergy
18th-century scholars
19th-century English people
19th-century Christian clergy
19th-century scholars
Arian Christians
Classics educators
English classical scholars
English logicians
People from the City of London
Writers from London
English philosophers
Burials at Bunhill Fields